The men's +100 kilograms (Heavyweight) competition at the 2014 Asian Games in Incheon was held on 22 September 2014 at the Dowon Gymnasium.

Takeshi Ojitani of Japan won the gold medal after beating Ölziibayaryn Düürenbayar in the final.

Schedule
All times are Korea Standard Time (UTC+09:00)

Results

Main bracket

Repechage

References

External links
Official website

M101
Judo at the Asian Games Men's Heavyweight